Hedley Maude Smith, later McDougald (May 9, 1905 – November 17, 1996), was a Canadian pairs skater, who was also known as "Jim" or "Jay". Together with Jack Eastwood she placed tenth at the 1928 Winter Olympics and sixth-seventh at the world championships in 1928, 1930 and 1932. The pair finished second at the national championships in 1929 and 1933 and third in 1934.

Smith was married to the prominent Canadian businessman John A. McDougald. She had a younger sister Cecil, who also competed at the 1928 Olympics. Their mother, Maude Delano-Osborne, won the 1892 Canadian tennis championship.

References

1905 births
1996 deaths
Canadian female pair skaters
Figure skaters at the 1928 Winter Olympics
Olympic figure skaters of Canada
Figure skaters from Toronto